David Kerr may refer to:
 Dave Kerr (1909–1978), Canadian ice hockey player
 David Kerr (cricketer) (1923–1989), Australian cricketer
 David Kerr (director), British television director
 David Kerr (cinematographer), British cinematographer
 David Kerr (religion scholar) (1945–2008), British scholar of Christian-Muslim relations and world Christianity
 David Kerr (Northern Irish politician) (born 1957), chair of the Third Way group
 David Kerr (Ontario politician) (1900–1978), Canadian politician
 David Kerr (footballer) (born 1974), Scottish footballer
 David Kerr (Missouri politician), Director of the Missouri Department of Economic Development
 David Kerr (English politician) (1923–2009), British Labour Member of Parliament, 1964–1970
 David Kerr (oncologist) (born 1956), cancer specialist
 David Kerr (nephrologist) (1927–2014), British nephrologist
 David Kerr (Iowa politician) (born 1948), American politician
 David Kerr (rugby union) (1899–1969), Scotland rugby union player
 David Garret Kerr, American mining engineer
 David Kerr (Kansas politician) (born 1945), American politician